Cerastes is a genus of small, venomous vipers found in the deserts and semi-deserts of northern North Africa eastward through Arabia and Iran. Three species are currently recognized by ITIS, and an additional recently described species is recognized by the Reptile Database. Common names for members the genus include horned vipers, North African desert vipers, and cerastes vipers.

Description

The head is broad, flat and distinct from the neck. The head is covered with tubercularly keeled scales, which usually number 15 or more across, and a supraorbital horn may be present over each eye in some species. The snout is short and wide and the eyes, which are set well forward, are small to moderate in size. The body is short, stout and cylindrically depressed. The tail is short and tapers abruptly behind the vent. The dorsal scales are small, keeled, in 23-35 rows at midbody, with the keels of the oblique lateral row being serrated.

Although Cerastes are often referred to as horned vipers, only the two larger species, C. cerastes and C. gasperettii, are known to have horns, and even these do not always have them. Individuals with and without horns occur within the same population and even within the same litter.

When present, each horn consists of a single long, spine-like scale that can be folded back into an indentation in the postocular scale. They fold back in response to direct stimulation, thus streamlining the head and easing passage through burrows. Horns occur more often in individuals from sandy deserts as opposed to stony deserts. Specimens without horns have a prominent brow ridge instead.

The purpose of the horns is the subject of much speculation. One theory is that they allow a buildup of sand above the eyes while keeping it out of the eyes themselves. Another, more recent theory is simply that the horns serve to break up the outline of the head, making them harder for prey animals to spot.

Geographic range
They are found in North Africa eastward through Arabia and Iran. Mallow et al. (2003) describe the genus as being restricted to the deserts of North Africa and southwestern Asia, with the Negev desert acting as a filter zone between the three species mentioned in the table below.

Habitat
Desert and semi-desert.

Behavior
This genus is nocturnal and terrestrial (not known to climb into bushes), often hiding by burying themselves in the sand. Although often described as slow moving, these snakes are also capable of sidewinding. When doing so, they can move quickly across the sand.

Cerastes species are not known to be particularly ill-tempered ("fairly placid"), but when threatened they will often stand their ground and form C-shaped coils that are rubbed together to produce a rasping or crackling sound, similar to Echis. This is called stridulation. With enough provocation, they will strike from this position.

These snakes are capable of "sinking" quickly down into loose sand, using their keeled, angled and serrated lateral scales in a rocking motion. This process begins at the tail and moves forward until the entire head is buried and only the eyes and nostrils are exposed. They can bury themselves this way whether in an outstretched or a coiled position. See .

Feeding behavior and diet
These are ambush predators that lie buried in the sand, waiting for prey to pass by. Their diet consists mainly of rodents, birds, and lizards.

Reproduction
All three species lay eggs. However, those of C. vipera hatch within hours of deposition as opposed to many weeks, something not previously observed in other African snakes, most of which lay eggs that hatch weeks later or give birth to live young.

Species

In addition to the three above species recognized by "ITIS", the Reptile Database also recognizes Cerastes boehmei Wagner & Wilms, 2010.

Taxonomy
Although it would seem that Laurenti changed his mind in 1768 and decided to name this genus Aspis, instead of Cerastes as he did earlier, this was eventually rejected. The International Commission on Zoological Nomenclature (ICZN) later placed the name Cerastes on the Official List of Generic Names in Zoology (name no. 1539), while the name Aspis was placed on the Official Index of Invalid Generic Names in Zoology (name no. 1630).

References

Further reading

 Cohen AC, Meyers BC. 1970. A function of the horn in the sidewinder rattlesnake Crotalus cerastes, with comments on other horned snakes. Copeia (American Society of Ichthyologists and Herpetologists) 3: 574–5755.
 Fitzinger LJFJ. 1843. Systema Reptilium. Fasciculus Primus. Amblyglossae. Vienna: Braumüller et Seidel. 106 pp. [28].
 Greene HW. 1988. "Antipredator mechanisms in reptiles". In: Gans C, editor. 1988. The Biology of the Reptilia. Vol. 16. New York: Academic Press. pp 212–317.
 Kramer E, Schnurrenberger H. 1958. Zur Schlangenfauna von Libyen. Die Aquarien und Terrarien Zeitschrift XI.2., 1.2.: 57–59.
 Laurenti JN. 1768. Specimen medicum, exhibens synopsin reptilium emendatum cum experimentis circa venena et antidota reptilium austriacorum. Vienna: Joan. Thom. Nob. de Trattern. 214 pp. + 5 plates. [81, 105].
 Mohamed AH, Khaled LZ. 1966. Effect of venom of Cerastes cerastes on nerve tissue and skeletal muscle. Toxicon (Great Britain) 3: 233–234.
 Mohamed AH, Abdel-Baset A, Hassan A. 1980. Immunological studies on monovalent and bivalent Cerastes antivenin. Toxicon (Great Britain) 18: 384–387.
 Schnurrenberger H. 1959. Observations on behavior in two Libyan species of viperine snake. Herpetologica (Herpetologists' League) 15: 70–72.
 Sterer Y. 1992. A mixed litter of horned and hornless Cerastes cerastes. Israel Journal of Zoology 37: 247–249.
 Werner YL, Verdier A, Rosenman D, Sivan N. 1991. Systematics and Zoogeography of Cerastes (Ophidia: Viperidae) in the Levant: 1. Distinguishing Arabian from African "Cerastes cerastes". The Snake (The Japan Snake Institute, Yabuzuka Honmachi, Nittagun, Gunma Prefecture, Japan) 23: 90–100.
 U.S. Navy. 1991. Poisonous Snakes of the World. New York: Dover Books. (Reprint of United States Government Printing Office, Washington D.C.) 133 pp. .
 Wagler J. 1830. Natürliches System der Amphibien, mit vorangehender Classification der Säugthiere und Vögel. Munich, Stuttgart, and Tübingen: J.G. Cotta.  vi + 354 pp. + 9 plates. [178].

External links

 

Articles containing video clips
Snake genera
Viperinae
Taxa named by Josephus Nicolaus Laurenti